Karen Lesley Martin (born 24 November 1974) is a female retired English international javelin thrower.

Athletics career
She represented England and won a silver medal in the javelin, at the 1998 Commonwealth Games in Kuala Lumpur, Malaysia.

Her personal best throw is 59.50 metres, achieved in July 1999 in Cosford. This places her third on the British outdoor all-time list, behind Kelly Morgan and Goldie Sayers.

She attended Littleover Community School in Derby.

International competitions

References

1974 births
Living people
British female javelin throwers
English female javelin throwers
Commonwealth Games silver medallists for England
Commonwealth Games medallists in athletics
Athletes (track and field) at the 1998 Commonwealth Games
Athletes (track and field) at the 2002 Commonwealth Games
Medallists at the 1998 Commonwealth Games